André Grillon (1 November 1921 – 20 June 2003) was a French footballer and football manager. He was capped 15 times for France.

Career 
Grillon played as a defender, for EF Bordeaux-Guyenne, Stade Français, RC Paris, Lyon and Caen, where he ended his playing career.

International 
He was capped 15 times for France. He played his first match in 1946 against Czechoslovakia and his last match in 1951 against Austria.

Coaching 
He began his coaching career with Stade Français and also coached Caen, US Le Mans, Annecy, Amiens and Lucé. He also managed the French Olympic team at the 1968 Summer Olympics in Mexico City.

References

External links
 
 
  
 André Grillon at pari-et-gagne.com 

1921 births
2003 deaths
Footballers from Paris
French footballers
Association football defenders
EF Bordeaux-Guyenne players
Stade Français (association football) players
Racing Club de France Football players
Olympique Lyonnais players
Stade Malherbe Caen players
Ligue 1 players
Ligue 2 players
France international footballers
French football managers
Stade Malherbe Caen managers
Le Mans FC managers
FC Annecy managers
France national football team managers
Amiens SC managers
Ligue 1 managers
Ligue 2 managers